Cufar Airport  is an airport serving Cufar, a village in the Tombali Region of Guinea-Bissau.

See also
Transport in Guinea-Bissau
List of airports in Guinea-Bissau

References

 Google Earth

External links
OurAirports - Cufar
OpenStreetMap - Cufar

Airports in Guinea-Bissau